JS Verlorenkost is a defunct football team which was merged with US Hollerich Bonnevoie to create Union Sportive Luxembourg in 1925.

Defunct football clubs in Luxembourg
Football clubs in Luxembourg City
1925 disestablishments in Luxembourg